SS Denebola (T-AKR 289) is an Algol-class vehicle cargo ship that is currently maintained by the United States Maritime Administration as part of the Military Sealift Command's Ready Reserve Force (RRF).  She was built as a high speed container ship by Rotterdamsche D.D.Mij N.V. in Rotterdam, Netherlands, hull no. 332, for Sea-Land Service, Inc. and named SS Sea-Land Resource, USCG ON 550723, IMO 7325253. Due to her high operating cost, she was sold to the United States Navy in October 1981 as USNS Denebola (T-AK-289).

In keeping with the pattern of the naming the Algol-class ships after bright stars, the Denebola was named after Denebola, the third-brightest star in the constellation Leo.

Conversion
Conversion began on 22 November 1983 at Pennsylvania Shipbuilding in Chester, Pennsylvania.  Her cargo hold was redesigned into a series of decks connected by ramps so vehicles can be driven into and out of the cargo hold for fast loading and unloading.  She was also fitted with two sets of two cranes; one set located at midship capable of lifting 35 tons, and another set located aft capable of lifting 50 tons. She was delivered to the Military Sealift Command on 10 October 1985 as USNS Denebola (T-AKR 289).

Service
When not active, Denebola is kept in reduced operating status due to her high operating cost.  If needed, she can be activated and ready to sail in 96 hours.  Denebola took part in the Persian Gulf War in 1990.  Along with the other seven Algol class cargo ships, she transported 14 percent of all cargo delivered between the United States and Saudi Arabia during and after the war. In 1994, Denebola, along with USNS Capella (T-AKR-293), worked with NATO forces on convoy exercises in the Mediterranean.

On 1 October 2007, Denebola was transferred to the United States Maritime Administration.  On 1 October 2008, she was transferred to the Ready Reserve Force, losing her USNS designation. If activated, Denebola will report to the Military Sealift Command and change her prefix designation from SS to USNS.

Together with sistership SS Antares, Denebola resides in Baltimore harbor (June, 2022).

References
U.S. Coast Guard District 5 Local Notice to Mariners Week 49/20 8 DEC 20, at page 25

 

Ships built in Rotterdam
Algol-class vehicle cargo ships
1973 ships
Cold War auxiliary ships of the United States
Gulf War ships of the United States